Regina—Wascana (formerly Wascana) is a federal electoral district in Saskatchewan, Canada, that has been represented in the House of Commons of Canada since 1988.

Geography
Most of the riding is within the provincial capital city of Regina, in southern Saskatchewan.

The riding is bordered on the south by Fifth Base Line; on the west by Albert Street; on the north-west by the Canadian Pacific Railway; on the north by Victoria Avenue; and on the east by Range Road 190.

The riding is bordered on the south by Moose Jaw—Lake Centre—Lanigan; on the west by Regina—Lewvan; and on the north and east by Regina—Qu'Appelle. The riding lost significant territory in the 2012 re-distribution to Moose Jaw—Lake Centre—Lanigan and Souris—Moose Mountain, but lost very little population.

Demographics
According to the Canada 2016 Census

Ethnic groups: 70.1% White, 7.8% Indigenous, 6.4% South Asian, 4.4% Chinese, 3.5% Black, 3.2% Filipino, 1.5% Southeast Asian, 
Languages: 78.3% English, 2.3% Mandarin, 2.0% Tagalog, 1.6% French, 1.3% Punjabi, 1.3% German, 1.1% Urdu, 1.1% Cantonese 
Religions (2011): 68.3% Christian (31.3% Catholic, 12.0% United Church, 6.6% Lutheran, 3.2% Anglican, 2.2% Baptist, 1.5% Christian Orthodox, 1.2% Pentecostal, 10.3% Other), 2.0% Muslim, 1.3% Buddhist, 1.1% Hind, 25.8 No religion 
Median income (2015): $42,192 
Average income (2015): $55,770

History
The electoral district was created in 1988 from Regina East, Regina West and Assiniboia. The seat has been held by former Minister of Finance and current Minister of Public Safety Ralph Goodale since 1993. Along with Winnipeg North, Wascana was one of only two seats retained by the Liberals in the Prairie Provinces in the 2011 election.

Members of Parliament

This riding has elected the following member of the House of Commons of Canada:

Current Member of Parliament
Its Member of Parliament is Michael Kram. He was first elected in the 2019 Canadian federal election, after having run and finishing second in the 2015 Canadian federal election. He is a member of the Conservative Party of Canada.

Election results

Regina—Wascana: 2015–present

Wascana: 1997–2015

Regina—Wascana: 1988–1993

See also
 List of Canadian federal electoral districts
 Past Canadian electoral districts

References

 
 Expenditures - 2004
 Expenditures - 2000
 Expenditures - 1997

Notes

Saskatchewan federal electoral districts
Politics of Regina, Saskatchewan